Llanidloes High School is a state secondary school and sixth form in Llanidloes, Powys. The school had 564 pupils on roll in 2016. It is an English-medium school with significant Welsh language provision, with pupils attending from other parts of Powys.

The school was rated good in a 2016 Estyn report and green in the 2019 national school categorization. The school was also included in The Times top ten sixth forms in Wales in 2018 and 2019.

The school is also home to the North Powys ASD centre.

Notable former pupils

 Neil Ferguson, infectious disease epidemiologist
Iwan Roberts, former footballer
Adam Woodyatt, actor

References

Secondary schools in Powys
Llanidloes